Clint Gabriel Yorke (born 7 June 1962) is a former cricketer who played for the Trinidad and Tobago national cricket team in West Indian domestic cricket as an opening batsman.

References

External links

1962 births
Living people
Trinidad and Tobago cricketers
People from Tobago
Tobagonian cricketers